Events in the year 1989 in Greece.

Incumbents
President – Christos Sartzetakis
Prime Minister of Greece – Andreas Papandreou (until 2 July), Tzannis Tzannetakis (2 July – 12 October), Ioannis Grivas (12 October – 23 November), Xenophon Zolotas (starting 23)

Births

 12 January – Olga-Afroditi Pilaki, rhythmic gymnast
 29 January – Maria Kakiou, rhythmic gymnast
 24 June – Ilektra-Elli Efthymiou, rhythmic gymnast

References

 
Years of the 20th century in Greece
Greece
1980s in Greece
Greece